The renal clearance ratio or fractional excretion is a relative measure of the speed at which a constituent of urine passes through the kidneys. It is defined by following equation:

 X is the analyte substance
 Cx is the renal plasma clearance of X
 Cin is the renal plasma clearance of inulin.

Creatinine is sometimes used instead of inulin as the reference substance.

See also
 Clearance (pharmacology)
 Kt/V

References

Nephrology